Cuban protests may refer to:

 Negro Rebellion, 1912
 Cuban Revolution, 1953–1959
 Maleconazo, in 1994
 Black Spring (Cuba), in 2003
 2020 Cuban protests
 2021 Cuban protests

See also
 Cuban Revolution (disambiguation)